Sean Jones (born March 2, 1982) is a former American football safety. He was drafted by the Cleveland Browns in the second round of the 2004 NFL Draft and also played for the Philadelphia Eagles and Tampa Bay Buccaneers. He played college football at Georgia.

Early years
Jones attended Westlake High School where he played both as a quarterback and a safety. He passed for 2,490 yards and 31 touchdowns and also rushed for 806 yards with 11 touchdowns as a senior.

College career
Jones played in 37 games at the University of Georgia, starting 24 times and finished with 250 tackles, 1 sack, 10 stops for losses, four quarterback pressures, three fumble recoveries, seven interceptions, and four blocked kicks. He was an education major.

Professional career

Cleveland Browns
Jones was selected by the Cleveland Browns in the second round (59th overall) in the 2004 NFL Draft. However, he missed his entire rookie season due to a knee injury suffered before the start of the season.

In the 2005 season, he appeared in all 16 games, playing mostly on special teams. He made his NFL debut versus the Cincinnati Bengals on September 11 and finished the season with 23 total tackles.

In 2006, Jones started all 16 regular season games and recorded 111 tackles. He also led all NFL strong safeties with five interceptions. He made a career-high 13 tackles at the Cincinnati Bengals on September 17. He was named the AFC Defensive Player of the week with three tackles and two interceptions versus the New York Jets on October 29.

Just as he did in the previous season, he started in all 16 regular season games of the 2007 season. He had 96 tackles and five interceptions, which again led all players at his position.

In 2008 he returned to the Browns as the starting strong safety again. This time only starting 12 games due to injury. He still tallied 56 tackles, 1 forced fumble, 4 interceptions, and 4 deflected passes.

Philadelphia Eagles
In 2009, Jones replaced Brian Dawkins as the starting free safety for the Philadelphia Eagles. An unrestricted free agent in the 2009 offseason, Jones was signed to a one-year contract worth $3 million by the Philadelphia Eagles on March 6. It was reported that Jones had to take a pay cut around $500,000 to stay on the roster for 2009. In week 11, Jones intercepted Chicago Bears quarterback Jay Cutler on the team's last drive to preserve a 24-20 victory for the Eagles.

Tampa Bay Buccaneers
On March 16, 2010, Jones signed a two-year contract with the Tampa Bay Buccaneers.

Detroit Lions
Jones signed with the Detroit Lions on June 25, 2012. He was released on August 27, 2012.

References

External links
Cleveland Browns bio
Philadelphia Eagles bio

1982 births
Living people
Players of American football from Atlanta
American football safeties
Georgia Bulldogs football players
Cleveland Browns players
Philadelphia Eagles players
Tampa Bay Buccaneers players
Detroit Lions players